The following include various records set by umpires in Major League Baseball. Leagues are abbreviated as follows:

AA – American Association, 1882–1891
AL – American League, 1901–1999
FL – Federal League, 1914–1915
ML – Major League Baseball, 2000–present (AL and NL umpiring staffs were merged in 2000)
NL – National League, 1876–1999
PL – Players' League, 1890

Regular season

Total games
The following are those umpires who have officiated in at least 3,000 major league games through the 2019 season. Although the totals reflect all games umpired, the years indicate only those seasons in which each individual was employed as a league umpire, omitting seasons in which they may have acted as an emergency substitute during their playing career. Umpires who were active in 2021 are indicated in bold face; members of the Baseball Hall of Fame are indicated in italics:

Joe West – 5,460 (NL, 1976–1999; ML, 2002–2021)
Bill Klem – 5,369 (NL, 1905–1941)
Bruce Froemming – 5,163 (NL, 1971–1999; ML, 2000–2007)
Gerry Davis – 4,849 (NL, 1982–1999; ML, 2000–2021)
Tommy Connolly – 4,768 (NL, 1898–1900; AL, 1901–1932)
Doug Harvey – 4,673 (NL, 1962–1992)
Joe Brinkman – 4,505 (AL, 1972–1999; ML, 2000–2006)
Harry Wendelstedt – 4,500 (NL, 1966–1998)
Derryl Cousins – 4,496 (AL, 1979–1999; ML, 2000–2012)
Bill McGowan – 4,424 (AL, 1925–1954)
Mike Reilly – 4,491 (AL, 1977–1999; ML, 2000–2010)
Jerry Crawford – 4,371 (NL, 1976–1999; ML, 2000–2010)
Ed Montague – 4,369 (NL, 1974, 1976–1999; ML, 2000–2009)
Larry Barnett – 4,290 (AL, 1969–1999)
Tim McClelland – 4,236 (AL, 1981–1999; ML, 2000–2013)
Al Barlick – 4,231 (NL, 1940–1943, 1946–1955, 1958–1971)
Bob Emslie – 4,228 (AA, 1890; NL, 1891–1924)
Bill Dinneen – 4,218 (AL, 1909–1937)
Tim Welke – 4,216 (AL, 1983–1999; ML, 2000–2015)
Dana DeMuth – 4,213 (NL, 1983–1999; ML, 2000–2019)
Cy Rigler – 4,144 (NL, 1906–1922, 1924–1935)
Bill Summers – 4,121 (AL, 1933–1959)
Larry McCoy – 4,024 (AL, 1970–1999)
Hank O'Day – 3,986 (NL, 1895–1911, 1913, 1915–1927)
Dave Phillips – 3,934 (AL, 1971–1999; ML, 2001–2002)
Bob Davidson – 3,911 (NL, 1982–1999; ML, 2005–2016)
Jim Evans – 3,897 (AL, 1971–1999)
Dale Scott – 3,892 (AL, 1985–1999; ML, 2000–2017)
Nestor Chylak – 3,857 (AL, 1954–1978)
Lee Weyer – 3,827 (NL, 1961–1988)
Don Denkinger – 3,824 (AL, 1969–1998)
Jim Honochick – 3,815 (AL, 1949–1973)
Tom Gorman – 3,803 (NL, 1951–1977)
Augie Donatelli – 3,775 (NL, 1950–1973)
Frank Pulli – 3,774 (NL, 1972–1999)
Terry Tata – 3,743 (NL, 1973–1999)
Mike Winters – 3,741 (NL, 1988–1999, ML 2000–2019)
Randy Marsh – 3,707 (NL, 1981–1999; ML, 2000–2009)
Bob Engel – 3,630 (NL, 1965–1990)
John Kibler – 3,630 (NL, 1963–1989)
Jocko Conlan – 3,618 (NL, 1941–1965)
Larry Napp – 3,608 (AL, 1951–1974)
Hank Soar – 3,595 (AL, 1950–1975, 1977–1978)
John Hirschbeck – 3,589 (AL, 1983–1999; ML, 2000–2007, 2009–2011, 2013–2016)
Ed Vargo – 3,555 (NL, 1960–1983)
Beans Reardon – 3,522 (NL, 1926–1949)
Jim McKean – 3,514 (AL, 1974–1999; ML, 2000–2001)
Jerry Layne – 3,501 (NL, 1989–1999; ML 2000–present)
Gary Cederstrom – 3,461 (AL, 1989–1999; ML 2000–2019)
Billy Williams – 3,432 (NL, 1963–1987)
Rich Garcia – 3,398 (AL, 1975–1999)
Babe Pinelli – 3,398 (NL, 1935–1956)
John McSherry – 3,396 (NL, 1971–1995)
Tom Hallion – 3,594 (NL, 1985–1999; ML 2005–present)
Rick Reed – 3,391 (AL, 1979–1999; ML, 2000–2009)
Al Clark – 3,390 (AL, 1976–1999; ML, 2000–2001)
Ángel Hernández – 3,655 (NL 1991–1999, ML 2000–present)
Eddie Rommel – 3,364 (AL, 1938–1959)
Tim Tschida – 3,358 (AL, 1985–1999; ML, 2000–2012)
Ernie Quigley – 3,350 (NL, 1913–1938)
Johnny Stevens – 3,345 (AL, 1948–1971, 1973, 1975)
George Hildebrand – 3,331 (AL, 1913–1934)
Brick Owens – 3,325 (NL, 1908, 1912–1913; AL, 1916–1937)
Billy Evans – 3,319 (AL, 1906–1927)
Brian Gorman – 3,430 (NL, 1991–1999; ML 2000–2021)
Gary Darling – 3,270 (NL, 1986–1999; ML, 2002–2013)
Jim Joyce – 3,268 (AL, 1987–1999; ML 2000–2016)
Greg Kosc – 3,256 (AL, 1976–1999)
Ed Sudol – 3,247 (NL, 1957–1977)
Larry Goetz – 3,223 (NL, 1936–1956)
Lee Ballanfant – 3,208 (NL, 1936–1957)
Red Flaherty – 3,207 (AL, 1953–1973)
Bill Stewart – 3,199 (NL, 1933–1954)
Paul Runge – 3,196 (NL, 1973–1997)
Charley Moran – 3,184 (NL, 1918–1939)
Frank Umont – 3,147 (AL, 1954–1973)
Joe Paparella – 3,143 (AL, 1946–1965)
Dale Ford – 3,137 (AL, 1975–1999)
Shag Crawford – 3,121 (NL, 1956–1975)
Durwood Merrill – 3,121 (AL, 1976–1999)
Ted Barrett - 3,281 (AL, 1994–1999; ML 2000–present)
Paul Pryor – 3,094 (NL, 1961–1981)
Charlie Berry – 3,080 (AL, 1942–1962)
Bill Haller – 3,068 (AL, 1961, 1963–1982)
John Shulock – 3,050 (AL, 1979–1999; ML, 2000–2002)
George Moriarty – 3,047 (AL, 1917–1926, 1929–1940)
Jerry Neudecker – 3,025 (AL, 1966–1985)
Marty Springstead – 3,010 (AL, 1966–1985)

Home plate
The following are those umpires who have acted as home plate umpire, or umpire-in-chief, for at least 1,000 major league games through the 2015 season. Umpires who were active in 2015 are indicated in bold face; members of the Baseball Hall of Fame are indicated in italics:

Bill Klem – 3,544 (NL, 1905–1941)
Hank O'Day – 2,710 (NL, 1895–1911, 1913, 1915–1927)
Cy Rigler – 2,468 (NL, 1906–1922, 1924–1935)
Bob Emslie – 2,358 (AA, 1890; NL, 1891–1924)
Tommy Connolly – 2,316 (NL, 1898–1900; AL, 1901–1932)
Bill Dinneen – 1,926 (AL, 1909–1937)
Silk O'Loughlin – 1,812 (AL, 1902–1918)
Billy Evans – 1,757 (AL, 1906–1927)
Bill McGowan – 1,644 (AL, 1925–1954)
Ernie Quigley – 1,509 (NL, 1913–1938)
Brick Owens – 1,447 (NL, 1908, 1912–1913; AL, 1916–1937)
Jack Sheridan – 1,436 (PL, 1890; NL, 1892–1893, 1896–1897; AL, 1901–1914)
Bill Summers – 1,364 (AL, 1933–1959)
Tom Lynch – 1,309 (NL, 1888–1899, 1902)
Charley Moran – 1,307 (NL, 1918–1939)
George Hildebrand – 1,301 (AL, 1913–1934)
Bruce Froemming – 1,300 (NL, 1971–1999; ML, 2000–2007)
Tim Hurst – 1,286 (NL, 1891–1898, 1900, 1903–1904; AL, 1905–1909)
Beans Reardon – 1,258 (NL, 1926–1949)
Jim Johnstone – 1,244 (AL, 1902; NL, 1903–1912; FL, 1915)
George Moriarty – 1,242 (AL, 1917–1926, 1929–1940)
Joe West – 1,390 (NL, 1976–1999; ML, 2002–2021)
Al Barlick – 1,202 (NL, 1940–1943, 1946–1955, 1958–1971)
Doug Harvey – 1,186 (NL, 1962–1992)
Dick Nallin – 1,161 (AL, 1915–1932)
Derryl Cousins – 1,137 (AL, 1979–1999; ML, 2000–2012)
Joe Brinkman – 1,131 (AL, 1972–1999; ML, 2000–2006)
Mike Reilly – 1,127 (AL, 1977–1999; ML, 2000–2010)
Harry Wendelstedt – 1,124 (NL, 1966–1998)
Ed Montague – 1,097 (NL, 1974, 1976–1999; ML, 2000–2009)
Larry Barnett – 1,090 (AL, 1969–1999)
Jerry Crawford – 1,086 (NL, 1976–1999; ML, 2000–2010)
Babe Pinelli – 1,081 (NL, 1935–1956)
Tim McClelland – 1,075 (AL, 1981–1999; ML, 2000–2013)
Jocko Conlan – 1,069 (NL, 1941–1965)
Bill Stewart – 1,046 (NL, 1933–1954)
John Gaffney – 1,036 (NL, 1884–1887, 1891–1894, 1898–1900; AA, 1888–1889; PL, 1890)
Eddie Rommel – 1,029 (AL, 1938–1959)
Larry McCoy – 1,015 (AL, 1970–1999)
Bob Davidson – 1,009 (NL, 1982–1999; ML, 2005–2016)
Larry Goetz – 1,007 (NL, 1936–1956)

Ejections
The following are those umpires who have ejected more than 75 individuals (players/managers) in their career up through the 2013 season. Umpires who are active in 2017 are indicated in bold face; members of the Baseball Hall of Fame are indicated in italics:
 Bill Klem – 251 (NL, 1905–1941)
 Cy Rigler – 192 (NL, 1906–1935)
 Hank O'Day – 185 (NL, 1895–1911, 1913, 1915–1927) 
 Bob Davidson – 156 (NL, 1982–1999, ML 2005–2016)
 Joe West – 151 (NL, 1976–1999, ML 2002–2021)
 Silk O'Loughlin – 145 (AL, 1902–1918)
 Ernie Quigley – 141 (NL, 1913–1938)
 Bob Emslie – 127 (NL, 1891–1924)
 Derryl Cousins – 118 (AL 1979–1999, ML 2000–2012)
 Jocko Conlan – 116 (NL, 1941–1965)
 Lord Byron  – 115 (NL, 1913–1919)
 Gary Darling – 111 (NL 1986–1999, ML 2002–2013)
 Eddie Hurley – 110 (AL, 1947–1965)
 Frank Dascoli – 106 (NL, 1948–1961)
 Augie Donatelli – 103 (NL, 1950–1973) 
 Rich Garcia – 103 (AL, 1975–1999)
 Durwood Merrill – 99 (AL, 1977–1999)
 Jack Sheridan – 98 (PL, 1890, NL 1892–1914)
 Bill Stewart – 95 (NL, 1933–1954)
 Joe Brinkman – 95 (AL 1973–1999, ML 2000–2006)
 Larry Goetz – 94 (NL, 1936–1956)
 Bruce Froemming – 93 (NL 1971–1999, ML 2000–2007)
 George Magerkurth – 91 (NL, 1929–1947)
 Greg Kosc – 90 (AL, 1976–1999)
 Larry Barnett – 89 (AL 1969–1999)
 Bill Hohn – 89 (NL, 1989–1999, ML 2000–2011)
 Mike Winters – 89 (NL, 1990–1999, ML 2000–2019)
 John Hirschbeck – 87 (AL, 1983–1999, ML 2000–2016)
 Dale Ford – 86 (AL, 1975–1999)
 Mal Eason – 85 (NL, 1910–1917)
 Tim Tschida – 85 (AL, 1985–1999, ML 2000–2012)
 Jerry Layne – 84 (NL, 1989–1999, ML 2000–present)
 Jerry Crawford – 83 (NL 1976–1999, ML 2000–2010)
 Marty Foster – 82 (AL, 1996–1999, ML 2000–present)
 Dave Phillips – 82 (AL, 1971–1999, ML 2000–2002)
 Harry Wendelstedt – 80 (NL, 1966–1998)
 Shag Crawford – 79 (NL 1954–1975)
 John Shulock – 79 (AL, 1979–1999, ML 2000–2002)
 Tom Hallion – 79 (NL 1985–1999, ML 2005–present)
 Dale Scott – 77 (AL, 1986–1999, ML 2000–2017)
 Ken Kaiser – 75 (AL, 1977–1999)
 Lou Jorda – 75 (NL, 1927–1952)
 Tim McClelland – 75 (AL, 1981–1999, ML 2000–2013)
 Al Barlick – 75 (NL, 1940–1943, 1946–1955, 1958–1971)

Postseason
In the postseason charts, crew chiefs are denoted by a † following the year. The position of crew chief was not as clearly established in the early years of the 20th century; for the purpose of this list, the crew chief for early World Series is defined as the home plate umpire for Game 1.

World Series
The World Series has been played from 1903–present, except 1904 and 1994. The position of crew chief usually alternated between umpires of the American League and National League, with NL umpires serving as crew chief in odd-numbered years from 1903 through 1933 except for 1905, 1917 and 1923, and again from 1995 through 1999, and in even-numbered years in 1906, 1912, 1918 through 1922, and 1936 through 1992. After the AL and NL staffs were merged in 2000, the position of crew chief was awarded to a former NL umpire every year through 2007.
Most Series
18 – Bill Klem (1908, 1909, 1911†, 1912†, 1913†, 1914, 1915†, 1917, 1918, 1920†, 1922†, 1924, 1926, 1929†, 1931†, 1932, 1934, 1940†)
10 – Hank O'Day (1903†, 1905, 1907†, 1908, 1910, 1916, 1918†, 1920, 1923, 1926)
10 – Cy Rigler (1910, 1912, 1913, 1915, 1917, 1919†, 1921†, 1925†, 1928, 1930)
8 – Tommy Connolly (1903, 1908, 1910†, 1911, 1913, 1916†, 1920, 1924†)
8 – Bill Dinneen (1911, 1914†, 1916, 1920, 1924, 1926†, 1929, 1932†)
8 – Bill McGowan (1928, 1931, 1935, 1939†, 1941†, 1944, 1947†, 1950)
8 – Bill Summers (1936, 1939, 1942, 1945†, 1948, 1951†, 1955†, 1959†)
7 – Al Barlick (1946, 1950, 1951, 1954†, 1958†, 1962†, 1967)
6 – Billy Evans (1909, 1912, 1915, 1917, 1919, 1923†)
6 – Jim Honochick (1952, 1955, 1960, 1962, 1968, 1972)
6 – Ed Montague (1986, 1991, 1997†, 2000†, 2004†, 2007†)
6 – Babe Pinelli (1939, 1941, 1947, 1948, 1952†, 1956†)
6 – Ernie Quigley (1916, 1919, 1921, 1924, 1927†, 1935)
6 – Joe West (1992, 1997, 2005†, 2009, 2012, 2016)
6 – Gerry Davis (1996, 1999, 2004, 2009†, 2012†, 2017†)

Most Series games
103 – Bill Klem
62 – Cy Rigler
57 – Hank O'Day
47 – Bill Summers
45 – Tommy Connolly
45 – Bill Dinneen
43 – Bill McGowan
42 – Al Barlick
42 – Jim Honochick

League Championship Series
A League Championship Series has been played in each league from 1969 to the present, excepting 1994. Originally a best-of-five series, it was expanded to best-of-seven in 1985.
12 – Jerry Crawford (1980, 1983, 1985, 1990, 1993, 1995, 1996, 1999, 2001†, 2003†, 2005†, 2006†; all NL except 2005–2006)
11 – Gerry Davis (1990, 1992, 1995, 1998, 2000, 2001, 2005, 2010†, 2013†, 2014†, 2018†; all NL except 2000 and 2010)
10 – Bruce Froemming (1973, 1977, 1980, 1982, 1985, 1989, 1991, 1993†, 1997†, 2000†; all NL)
10 – Joe West (1981, 1986, 1988, 1993, 1996, 2003, 2004, 2013†, 2014†, 2018†; all NL except 2003–2004, 2013–14, 2018)
9 – Doug Harvey (1970, 1972, 1976, 1980, 1983, 1984, 1986†, 1989†, 1991†; all NL)
9 – Randy Marsh (1989, 1992, 1995, 2000, 2002†, 2004†, 2005, 2007†, 2009†; NL except 2000, 2004–2005, 2007)
9 – Tim McClelland (1988, 1995, 1999†, 2001, 2003†, 2005†, 2007†, 2008†, 2009†; AL except 2001, 2005, 2007)
9 – Mike Reilly (1983, 1987, 1991, 1996, 1997, 2001, 2003, 2006, 2008†; all AL except 2001, 2003, 2008)
9 – Paul Runge (1977, 1981, 1982, 1984, 1985, 1988, 1990, 1995†, 1996†; all NL)
8 – John McSherry (1974, 1978, 1983, 1984, 1985, 1988, 1990, 1992†; all NL)
9 – Ted Barrett  (2005, 2008, 2009, 2010, 2012, 2013, 2015†, 2016)  2020, all NL except 2005, 2020)
7 – Larry Barnett (1972, 1976, 1979†, 1982†, 1986†, 1991†, 1996†; all AL)
7 – Jim Evans (1975, 1979, 1983, 1985, 1990, 1993†, 1998†; all AL)
7 – Ed Montague (1979, 1987, 1992, 1996, 1999†, 2001†, 2002†; all NL except 2001–2002)
7 – Terry Tata (1976, 1980, 1983†, 1985, 1989, 1993, 1998†; all NL)
7 – Harry Wendelstedt (1970, 1972, 1977, 1981, 1982, 1988†, 1990†; all NL)
7 – Derryl Cousins (1985, 1989, 1995, 2003, 2006, 2008, 2010†; all AL except 2010)

Most Series games
64 – Jerry Crawford
64 – Gerry Davis
60 – Joe West
52 – Bruce Froemming
50 – Tim McClelland
47 – Randy Marsh
46 – Mike Reilly
50 – Ted Barrett
43 – Paul Runge
41 – Derryl Cousins
40 – Ed Montague
39 – John McSherry
38 – Doug Harvey
36 – Larry Barnett

Division Series
Two Division Series have been played in each league in 1981 and from 1995 to the present; they have been best-of-five series in all years. Listed below are umpires with at least 9 Division Series. Bold indicates that the umpire is active entering the 2020 season.
Most Series
13 – Gerry Davis (1996, 1999, 2002†, 2003, 2004, 2006†, 2007, 2008, 2009†, 2011†, 2012†, 2012†, 2015†, 2017†; NL except 2002–2003, 2007, 2011, 2017)
12 – Dale Scott (1995, 1997, 1998, 2001, 2003, 2004†, 2005, 2007†, 2008†, 2011†, 2014†, 2015†; AL in 1995, 1997–1998, 2005, 2011, 2015)
11 – Dana DeMuth (1996, 1997, 1999, 2001†, 2008†, 2009†, 2010†, 2012†, 2013†, 2015†, 2017†; NL except 2001, 2012–2013, 2017)
11 – Jerry Layne (1995, 1998, 2001, 2002, 2005, 2010, 2011†, 2013†, 2014, 2017†, 2018†;  NL except 2001 and 2018)
11 – Mike Winters (1998†, 1999†, 2000, 2001, 2002, 2006, 2010, 2013, 2014†, 2015, 2018†;  NL except 2000, 2002, 2013, 2018)
12 – Ted Barrett (2000, 2001, 2002, 2003, 2006, 2007, 2011, 2014†  2017†, 2018†, 2019†; 2021†;  AL in 2001, 2003, 2007, 2011, 2013, 2014, 2017 
10 – Brian Gorman (1997, 1999†, 2000, 2001, 2003, 2004, 2006, 2009, 2011, 2012†; all NL except 2004, 2009, 2011–2012)
12 – Ron Kulpa (2001, 2002, 2006, 2007, 2008, 2009, 2011, 2015, 2018, 2017; all NL except 2001, 2007–08, 2015)
10 – Gary Darling (1995, 1997, 1998, 2002, 2003, 2005†, 2007†, 2008, 2010, 2013†; NL except 2003, 2005, 2007–2008, 2010, 2013)
10 – Jim Joyce (1995, 1998†, 1999†, 2001, 2002, 2003, 2008, 2009, 2012, 2013; all AL except 2001, 2008, 2012–2013)
10 – John Hirschbeck (1995, 1998, 1999, 2001, 2003†, 2005†, 2006†, 2010†, 2013†, 2016†; AL except 2001, 2003, 2006, 2010, 2013, 2016)
10 – Eric Cooper (2003, 2005, 2005, 2008, 2009, 2011, 2012, 2018, 2014, 2019; all AL except 2005–2006, 2014)
9 – Gary Cederstrom (2000, 2003, 2004, 2005, 2010, 2011, 2015†, 2018†, 2019†; all NL except 2004 and 2019)
9 – Jeff Kellogg (1998, 2000, 2003, 2007, 2008, 2010, 2011, 2014†, 2016†; all NL except 2008, 2010, and 2014)
9 – Tom Hallion (1996, 1997, 2008, 2012, 2013, 2014, 2016, 2018, 2019; all NL except 2013)
9 – Mike Everitt (2001, 2004, 2005, 2006, 2007, 2009, 2012, 2015,  2017; AL except 2001, 2007, 2009)
9 – Paul Emmel (2002, 2003, 2006, 2008, 2009, 2010, 2012, 2013,  2016; all AL except 2002, 2008, 2010, 2012)
9 – Mark Wegner (2003, 2004, 2006, 2008, 2009, 2010, 2012, 2013,  2017, 2019†; all AL except 2003, 2008, 2010, and 2012)
9 – Alfonso Marquez (2001, 2002, 2005, 2006, 2011, 2012, 2015, 2018, 2019; all NL except 2002, 2005–06, 2015)
9 – Greg Gibson (2001, 2003, 2004, 2006, 2007, 2009, 2010, 2011, 2015; NL except 2001, 2003, 2009–2011)
9 – Bruce Froemming (1981, 1995, 1996, 1998, 1999, 2001†, 2002†, 2003†, 2007†; all NL except 2007)
9 – Tim Tschida (1996, 1997, 1998, 2001, 2002, 2006, 2007, 2008, 2009†; all AL except 2001–2002)

Most Division Series games (umpires with more than 35 DS games are listed)
53 – Gerry Davis
45 – Jerry Layne
45 – Mike Winters
44 – Dana DeMuth
52 – Ron Kulpa
43 – Dale Scott
47 - Ted Barrett
42 – Jim Joyce
40 – Eric Cooper
48 – Ángel Hernández
39 – Gary Darling
37 – Mark Wegner
37 – Tom Hallion
37 – Bruce Froemming
36 – Jeff Kellogg

Total postseason
Most games 
151 – Gerry Davis 
132– Joe West 
132– Ted Barrett 
111 – Bruce Froemming 
111 – Jerry Crawford 
103 – Gary Cederstrom 
103 – Mike Winters 
103 – Bill Klem 
101 – Dana DeMuth 
99 – Jeff Kellogg 
99 – Ed Montague 
98 – Tim Welke 
96 – Brian Gorman 
103 – Jeff Nelson 
94 – Tim McClelland  
94 – John Hirschbeck 
101 – Angel Hernandez 
91 – Dale Scott 
89 – Jerry Layne 
103 – Alfonso Marquez 
104 – Bill Miller 
88 – Mike Everitt 
87 – Fieldin Culbreth

All-Star Games
The home plate umpire for each All-Star Game is denoted by a † following the year. There were two All-Star Games each year from 1959 to 1962; different umpiring crews were used for the games in each year except 1960 (for this list, the 1960 umpires are each counted once). For all games through the first 1961 contest and again in 1966, the umpires changed positions halfway through the game; both plate umpires are noted in the applicable years.
7 – Al Barlick: 1942, 1949†, 1952†, 1955†, 1959† (first game), 1966†, 1970†
7 – Doug Harvey: 1963, 1964, 1971, 1977, 1982†, 1987, 1992†
7 – Bill Summers: 1936†, 1941†, 1946†, 1949†, 1952†, 1955†, 1959† (second game)
6 – Jocko Conlan: 1943, 1947†, 1950, 1953†, 1958†, 1962† (second game)
6 – Eddie Rommel: 1939, 1943†, 1946, 1950, 1954†, 1958†
6 – Frank Secory: 1955, 1958, 1961 (second game), 1964, 1967, 1970
5 – Charlie Berry: 1944, 1948†, 1952, 1956†, 1959 (second game)
5 – Nestor Chylak: 1957, 1960 (†second game), 1964, 1973†, 1978
5 – Johnny Stevens: 1950, 1953, 1957†, 1960, 1965†

References

Umpires
Records